Demoz may refer to:

Demoz (rapper), rapper in the supergroup Army of the Pharaohs
Demoz (album), a 1999 album by Marcella Detroit

See also
Deimos (disambiguation)
Demo (disambiguation)
Demos (disambiguation)